Aldave is a surname. Notable people with the surname include:

Bryan Aldave (born 1983), Uruguayan footballer
Inaki Malumbres Aldave (born 1975), Spanish handball player
Mauro Aldave (born 1984), Uruguayan footballer